Nivedita Bhasin (born 1963) of Indian Airlines became the youngest woman pilot in world civil aviation history to command a commercial jet aircraft on 1 January 1990 at the age of 26.
Bhasin piloted IC-492 on the Bombay-Aurangabad-Udaipur sector.

Firsts 
Nivedita joined Indian Airlines in 1984 and has many firsts to her credit:
 She was the co-pilot on the first all-women crew flight on Fokker Friendship F-27 with Captain Saudamini Deshmukh in command in November 1985 on the Calcutta–Silchar route.
 They also made the first Boeing all-women crew flight in September 1989 on the Mumbai–Goa sector.
 In January 1990 she became the world's youngest commander at the age of 26 on the Boeing aircraft. 
 Later, she led the all-women crew of the Boeing flight as commander on the Hyderabad–Visakhapatnam route. She became a commander on Airbus A300, with over 8,100 hours of total flying experience. On 8 March 1999  she commanded Airbus A300 on the Delhi–Kathmandu route to mark International Women's Day.
 She became India's first woman check-pilot on Airbus A300 aircraft. Nivedita was accorded the Directorate General of Civil Aviation approval as check-pilot on successful completion of stipulated tests and requisite training. The latter involved classroom and field training for operational knowledge, simulator training for flying proficiency, aircraft training for landing/take-off, and line flying.
 Nivedita Bhasin brought the 787 Dreamliner from USA to India on 19 September 2012.

Personal life 
She was promoted to executive director flight safety in November 2020 .

Her Husband Rohit Bhasin & Daughter Niharika Bhasin work for INDIGO airlines, Her son Capt Rohan Bhasin is a commander on Boeing 777 and works for Air India .

References

External links 
 Taking off with the family
 India Today
 A toast to Indian woman fliers
 Indian women in aviation

1963 births
Indian women aviators
Living people
Indian aviators
Pahari Pothwari people
Punjabi Hindus
Commercial aviators
Indian women commercial aviators